United Nations Security Council Resolution 206, adopted unanimously on June 15, 1965, after reaffirming previous resolutions on the topic, the Council extended the stationing in Cyprus of the United Nations Peacekeeping Force in Cyprus for an additional 6 months, now ending on December 26, 1965.  The Council also called upon all member states to comply with this and previous resolutions, and upon the parties directly concerned to continue to act with the utmost restraint and to co-operate fully with the peacekeeping force.

See also
Cyprus dispute
List of United Nations Security Council Resolutions 201 to 300 (1965–1971)

References

Text of the Resolution at undocs.org

External links
 

 0206
 0206
1965 in Cyprus
June 1965 events